Husbands or Lovers (German title: Nju - Eine unverstandene Frau) is a 1924 German silent film directed by Paul Czinner and starring Elisabeth Bergner, Emil Jannings and Conrad Veidt. It was shot at the Staaken and EFA Studios in Berlin. The film's art direction was by Bohumil Hes and Paul Rieth.

Cast
 Elisabeth Bergner as Nju  
 Emil Jannings as Ehemann  
 Conrad Veidt as Der Liebhaber, ein Dichter  
 Maria Bard as Kindermädchen  
 Nils Edwall as Kind  
 Annie Röttgen 
 Margarete Kupfer 
 Karl Platen 
 Max Kronert 
 Walter Werner 
 Grete Lundt 
 Maria Forescu 
 Fritz Ley

References

Bibliography
 Eric Rentschler. German Film & Literature. Routledge, 2013.

External links

1924 films
Films of the Weimar Republic
Films directed by Paul Czinner
German silent feature films
German black-and-white films
UFA GmbH films
Films shot at Halensee Studios
Films shot at Staaken Studios